The Karabair (Ķaroboḩirī) is a long-established horse breed from Central Asia, and particularly from Uzbekistan and northern Tajikistan. It results from the cross-breeding of desert horses of Arabian or Turkmene type from the south with steppe horses from the north. It is a small, agile and versatile horse that can be used for riding or driving. It is well suited to local horse sports, and especially to the Uzbek national game, kokpar. It is also used for meat and milk production; the milk may be made into kumis.

In 2003, a total population of 138,400 Karabair horses were reported by Uzbekistan.

References 

Horse breeds
Horse breeds originating in Uzbekistan
Horse breeds originating in Tajikistan
Horse breeds originating in Kazakhstan